Orthogonius longiphallus is a species of ground beetle in the subfamily Orthogoniinae. It was described by Tian & Deuve in 2005.

References

longiphallus
Beetles described in 2005